Thomas Cunningham (born 7 August 1956), is an English former professional rugby league footballer who played in the 1970s and 1980s.

Background
Tommy Cunningham was born in St. Helens, Lancashire, England.

Playing career

International honours
Cunningham won caps for Wales while at Warrington 1979 (2?)-caps.

Notable tour matches
Tommy Cunningham played  in Warrington's 15–12 victory over Australia at Wilderspool Stadium, Warrington on Wednesday 11 October 1978.

Genealogical Information
Tommy Cunningham is the brother of rugby league footballers Eddie Cunningham and Keiron Cunningham.

References

External links
Profile at saints.org.uk
Statistics at wolvesplayers.thisiswarrington.co.uk

1956 births
Living people
English rugby league players
Rugby league hookers
Rugby league players from St Helens, Merseyside
St Helens R.F.C. players
Wales national rugby league team players
Warrington Wolves players